The 2012 Christy Ring Cup was the eighth season of the Christy Ring Cup since its establishment in 2005.

Teams
A total of eight teams contested the Christy Ring Cup, including seven sides from the 2011 Christy Ring Cup and London, who were promoted as champions of the 2011 Nicky Rackard Cup. London again ended the season as champions, this time in the Christy Ring Cup, thus securing promotion to the top tier of hurling, the All-Ireland Championship, in 2013. 

While both Armagh and Mayo had failed to win any of their (two) games in the 2011 Christy Ring Cup, Mayo retained their place in the 2012 edition with Armagh being relegated to the Nicky Rackard Cup for 2012 without a playoff game; Mayo had the longest tenure as a Christy Ring Cup member having competed in every season since the inaugural one in 2005 while Armagh had only joined the Christy Ring Cup in 2011, having won the previous year's Nicky Rackard Cup.

Team summaries

Stadia and locations

Structure
The tournament has a double elimination format - each team will play at least two games before being knocked out.
The eight teams play four Round 1 matches.
The winners in Round 1 advance to Round 2A.
The losers in Round 1 go into Round 2B.
There are two Round 2A matches.
The winners in Round 2A advance to the semi-finals.
The losers in Round 2A go into the quarter-finals.
There are two Round 2B matches.
The winners in Round 2B advance to the quarter-finals.
The losers in Round 2B are eliminated.
There are two quarter-final matches between the Round 2A losers and Round 2B winners.
The winners of the quarter-finals advance to the semi-finals.
The losers of the quarter-finals are eliminated.
There are two semi-final matches between the Round 2A winners and the quarter-final winners.
The winners of the semi-finals advance to the final.
The losers of the semi-finals are eliminated.
The winners of the final win the Christy Ring Cup for 2012 and are promoted to the Liam MacCarthy Cup 2013.

Fixtures

Round 1

Round 2A

Round 2B

Quarter-finals

Semi-finals

Final

Top scorers

Season

Single game

References

External links
 Christy Ring Cup fixtures

Christy Ring Cup
Christy Ring Cup